Sury-près-Léré (literally Sury near Léré) is a commune in the Cher department in the Centre-Val de Loire region of France.

Geography
The river Loire forms the eastern boundary of the commune.

Population

Sights
 The church of St.Jean-Baptiste, dating from the sixteenth century
 Two feudal mottes
 A watermill

See also
Communes of the Cher department

References

Communes of Cher (department)